Tetsujyo Deguchi (born 1950) is a Japanese Zen master, successor of Ban Tetsugyu Soin.

He is one of the last heirs of the master Harada Daiun Sogaku inside the Soto sect.
He contributed to the spreading of Zen in Italy contributing since the foundation to the birth and the growth of the Zen monastery Ensoji il Cerchio. 
He began to practice zazen since he was 16 years old and took the vows of monk when he was 30 years old.
During his monastic studies, he achieved a master's degree in Law at Chuo University, Tokyo.

In 1983 Tetsujyo received the Inka and became the abbot of the Tosho-ji, Tokyo, where he continues still today to propose the Zen teachings of Harada Daiun Sogaku to both Japanese and western apprentices.

External links
 https://web.archive.org/web/20141226075712/http://homepage3.nifty.com/toshoji/
 https://web.archive.org/web/20130716133457/http://www.monasterozen.it/it/il-lignaggio-i-maestri-del-buddhismo-zen/il-nostro-lignaggio/tetsujyo-deguchi.html
 https://web.archive.org/web/20150518092636/http://www.nossacasa.net/shunya/default.asp?menu=594
 http://www.ciolek.com/wwwvlpages/zenpages/haradayasutani.html

Zen Buddhist spiritual teachers
Japanese Buddhist clergy
1950 births
Living people
Chuo University alumni
People from Tokyo